Kozlovka is a rural locality (a selo) and the administrative center of Kozlovskoye Rural Settlement, Rudnyansky District, Volgograd Oblast, Russia. The population was 490 as of 2010. There are 3 streets.

Geography 
Kozlovka is located in steppe, on the Khopyorsko-Buzulukskaya Plain, 35 km northwest of Rudnya (the district's administrative centre) by road. Lemeshkino is the nearest rural locality.

References 

Rural localities in Rudnyansky District, Volgograd Oblast